The siege of Kunduz took place in 2001 during the War in Afghanistan. After the fall of Mazar-i-Sharif on 9 November, the focus of the Northern Alliance advance shifted towards the city of Kunduz, which was the last remaining Taliban stronghold in northern Afghanistan.

Timeline
Forces under the command of General Mohammed Daud Daud met up with American Special Forces advisers and advanced to the city of Taloqan, arriving outside the city on November 11. There, Daud's forces attacked without American air support, quickly routing the Taliban and seizing control of the city.

After routing the Taliban at Taloqan, Daud's forces moved to besiege Kunduz. They initially met heavy resistance, leading Daud to decide to entrench his forces around the city and use American air support to weaken the Taliban. For the next eleven days, American aircraft bombarded Taliban positions, destroying 44 bunker complexes, 12 tanks and 51 trucks as well as numerous supply dumps.

On 22 November, Daud's forces captured the nearby town of Khanabad. With their position deteriorating, the Taliban forces inside Kunduz agreed to surrender on 23 November. After the Taliban surrender, there were reports of looting by Northern Alliance soldiers as well as reports of the executions of Taliban prisoners.

Human rights groups estimate that several hundred or several thousand captured prisoners died in or after transit to Sherberghan prison. The deaths have become known as the Dasht-i-Leili massacre. Allegations have been made, notably by columnist Ted Rall and Jamie Doran's 2002 documentary Afghan Massacre: The Convoy of Death, that U.S. troops were involved. A July 2009 report in the New York Times caused United States President Barack Obama to order a probe into how the Bush administration handled calls for investigation of the massacre.

References

Afghanistan conflict (1978–present)
Conflicts in 2001
Battles of the War in Afghanistan (2001–2021)
Military operations of the War in Afghanistan (2001–2021) involving the United States
2001 in Afghanistan
History of Kunduz Province
November 2001 events in Asia
Attacks in Afghanistan in 2001
Battles in 2001